Mount Gardiner may refer to:

Mount Gardiner (Antarctica), a mountain in the Queen Maud Mountains of Antarctica
Mount Gardiner (British Columbia), a mountain in southwestern British Columbia, Canada
Mount Gardiner (California), a mountain in the Sierra Nevada, Canada
Mount Gardiner, Queensland is a rural location in Queensland, Australia

See also
Mount Gardner (disambiguation)